Solanum albornozii is a species of plant in the family Solanaceae. It is endemic to Ecuador.

References

albornozii
Endemic flora of Ecuador
Endangered plants
Taxonomy articles created by Polbot